Samuel Schatzmann (12 October 1955 – 2 November 2016) was a Swiss equestrian. He won a silver medal in team dressage at the 1988 Summer Olympics in Seoul, together with Otto Josef Hofer, Christine Stückelberger and Daniel Ramseier. 
At the 1988 Olympic Games in Seoul, he won on "Rochus" the silver medal in the team dressage together with Otto Hofer, Daniel Ramseier and Christine Stückelberger behind the West German team and in Canada. In the individual dressage he failed to qualify for the final round itself.

A year later Schatzmann won on the same horse bronze medal in the team event at the European Championships Dressage 1989 in Mondorf together with Otto Hofer, Daniel Ramseier and Ulrich Lehmann behind the teams of Germany and the Soviet Republic.

Schatzmann was a doctor of law and entrepreneur. He promoted the Westphalian horse breeding, as a breeder through cooperation with the North Rhine-Westphalian State Stud Warendorf. In 2015 he was awarded for his contribution to the Westphalian breeding the silver badge of honor of Westphalia Stud Book. [1] For several years he was president of the Association Central Swiss Concours riders.

References

External links

1955 births
2016 deaths
Swiss male equestrians
Swiss dressage riders
Olympic equestrians of Switzerland
Olympic silver medalists for Switzerland
Equestrians at the 1988 Summer Olympics
Olympic medalists in equestrian
Medalists at the 1988 Summer Olympics
20th-century Swiss people